Jules Alfred Pierrot Deseilligny (1868–1918) was a French selenographer.

The crater Deseilligny on the Moon is named after him.

1868 births
1918 deaths
20th-century French astronomers
Selenographers
19th-century French astronomers